Hoby with Rotherby is a civil parish in Leicestershire, England.  In the 2001 census it had a population of 594,  reducing to 556 at the time of the 2011 census.  It includes the villages of Hoby, Rotherby, Ragdale and Brooksby.  The parish is part of Melton local government district, and within the Rutland and Melton constituency.

Toponymy
The name 'Hoby' derives from the Old Norse for 'farm/settlement on a hill spur'.

The name 'Rotherby' means 'farm/settlement of Hreitharr'.

The name 'Ragdale' means 'throat valley' probably suggesting that the valley was narrow, like a throat.

References

External links 

 Leicestershire Parish Councils: Hoby with Rotherby

Civil parishes in Leicestershire